Kingsburgh is a resort town in KwaZulu-Natal, South Africa, 32 km south-west of Durban. The town is considered to be part of the KwaZulu-Natal South Coast.

History
Originally known as Southern Umlazi, it became a township in October 1942 and reached borough status in August 1952. Probably named after Richard Philip (Dick) King (1811-1871) who rode along here from Durban to Grahamstown on horseback to secure assistance for beleaguered British troops in 1842.

Geography
Kingsburgh lies on the Sapphire Coast which extends from Athlone Park in the north-east to Clansthal in south-west. The town is bordered by Amanzimtoti in the north-east, the Indian Ocean to the east, Umgababa in the south-west and Illovo North to the west. 

Kingsburgh comprises the seaside holiday resorts of Doonside, Illovo Beach, Karridene, St Winifred's Beach, Warner Beach and Winklespruit which lie to the east of the N2.

Kingsburgh's inner suburbs that lie on the hills above the town include Astra Park, Doonheights, Illovo Glen, Shulton Park and St Winifreds which lie west of the N2.

Commerce

Tourism 
The majority of Kingsburgh's economy made up of the tourism economy and signs of this can be found on the coastline where hotels and holiday accommodation apartments lie. 

The most notable and reputable hotels and holiday accommodation in Kingsburgh include the ATKV Natalia resort and Villa Spa Holiday Resort in Illovo Beach and just south of Illovo Beach is the Marriott's Protea Hotel Karridene Beach.

Retail 
Kingsburgh has a few shopping centres which are sizable and include Kingsburgh Centre and DSM Mall which are both in Winklespruit. The nearby shopping centres in Amanzimtoti are much larger with more shopping options and include Galleria Mall (largest mall south of Durban), Arbour Crossing and Seadoone Mall.

Transport 
The N2 highway runs through Kingsburgh separating the coastal resorts (from Karridene to Doonside) lying to the east from the sugarcane plantations and inland suburbs (from Astra Park to Doonheights) lying to the west. The national highway links the town to Amanzimtoti and Durban in the north-east and Port Shepstone in the south-west. Access to Kingsburgh from the N2 is obtained through the R603 interchange (Exit 133) in Winklespruit and the Seadoone Road interchange (Exit 137) in Doonside.

The R102 Winklespruit Road/Kingsway runs as the main artery of Kingsburgh along the coastal resorts of the town. The regional route links the town to Amanzimtoti to the north and Umkomaas to the south. 

The R603 Umbumbulu Road runs from the intersection with the R102 in Winklespruit to Umbumbulu and Umlaas Road in the north-west. The R603 can be used as an alternative route to Pietermaritzburg rather than using the N3 from Westville near Durban.

References

Populated places in eThekwini Metropolitan Municipality
KwaZulu-Natal South Coast